Billy Brown (born 20 December 1950) is a Scottish football coach and former player. He previously managed East Fife and Cowdenbeath. Brown played in the Scottish Football League for Motherwell and Raith Rovers. He then became a football coach, working at Berwick Rangers, Falkirk, Hearts, Bradford City and Kilmarnock with longtime colleague Jim Jefferies.

Club career
Brown was born in Musselburgh. He began his career at Hull City going on to play for Motherwell and Raith Rovers. His senior playing career was ended by a cruciate ligament injury at the age of 28. He continued to play at a junior level with Newtongrange Star and Musselburgh Athletic whilst with Musselburgh he became a coach.

Managerial career
Brown became assistant manager to Jim Jefferies, an old school friend from Musselburgh Grammar School, at Berwick Rangers in 1988. Since then he has followed him to Falkirk, Hearts, Bradford City and Kilmarnock. After leaving Kilmarnock with Jefferies in January 2010, Brown and Jefferies returned to Hearts soon afterwards. Jefferies and Brown were sacked by Hearts on 1 August 2011.

Brown was appointed assistant manager at Hibernian in September 2011. He was made caretaker manager of the club following the dismissal of Colin Calderwood in November and was interviewed for the job. Pat Fenlon was appointed manager, but Brown was retained as assistant manager until June 2012, when his contract expired.

Brown was appointed manager of East Fife in November 2012. Although East Fife struggled during the 2012–13 season, the club won the Scottish Second Division play-offs to stay in the third tier. On 5 June 2013, it was reported that Brown had parted company with East Fife, one month after a widely publicised post-match interview where he angrily criticised the club's fans following a defeat to Stenhousemuir FC. 

Brown then returned to Hearts, working as an unpaid assistant to manager Gary Locke. Hearts had recently entered administration and could not afford to offer a salary to an assistant coach. Brown was given a paid short-term contract in September 2013. In January 2014, Brown was informed that his contract would not be renewed. After a delegation of Hearts players met the club administrators, Brown was subsequently given another contract. Brown and Locke left Hearts at the end of the season, after Ann Budge took control of the club.

In 2017, Brown assisted Gary Locke during his time as manager of Cowdenbeath. When Locke left Cowdenbeath in July 2017 to take an ambassadorial role with Hearts, Brown was appointed Cowdenbeath manager. However, with the side 10th in the league after one win in 10, Brown resigned from his position on 31 October 2017.

Manager

References

External links
Neil Brown

1950 births
Living people
Motherwell F.C. players
Raith Rovers F.C. players
Newtongrange Star F.C. players
Musselburgh Athletic F.C. players
Kilmarnock F.C. non-playing staff
Heart of Midlothian F.C. non-playing staff
Hibernian F.C. non-playing staff
Hull City A.F.C. players
Bradford City A.F.C. non-playing staff
Scottish Football League players
Association football defenders
Falkirk F.C. non-playing staff
Scottish football managers
East Fife F.C. managers
Cowdenbeath F.C. managers
Scottish Professional Football League managers
Scottish footballers